PHA may refer to:

Science and technology 
 Phytohaemagglutinin, a type of lectin in plants
 Polycyclic aromatic hydrocarbons
 Polyhydroxyalkanoate, natural polyesters
 Potentially hazardous asteroid
 Process hazard analysis of an industrial process
Pseudohypoaldosteronism, a condition that mimics hypoaldosteronism but with high levels of aldosteron
 Pulse-height analyzer, an electronic instrument

Organizations 
 Partnership for a Healthier America, US
 Pakistan Housing Authority
 Parks and Horticulture Authority, Lahore, Pakistan
 Philadelphia Housing Authority, US
 Prince Hall Affiliated, US
 Private Hospitals Association (Jordan)
 Pulmonary Hypertension Association, US
 Puntland Highway Authority, Somalia

Placenames 
 Amphoe Pha Khao, Loei Province, Thailand
 Amphoe Phu Pha Man, Khon Kaen Province, Thailand
 Amphoe Tha Wang Pha, Nan Province, northern Thailand
 Amphoe Thong Pha Phum, Kanchanaburi Province, Thailand
 Cẩm Phả, Quảng Ninh Province, Vietnam
 Ko Pha Ngan, an island in the Gulf of Thailand
 Pha Oudom District, Bokeo Province, Laos
 Pha Taem, a national park in Thailand
 Pha That Luang, a Buddhist stupa in Vientiane, and a national symbol of Laos
 Than Sadet–Ko Pha-ngan National Park, Thailand

People 
 Hso Khan Pha (1938–2016), Burmese geologist
 Jazze Pha (stage name of Phalon Anton Alexander), American rapper, songwriter and producer
 Jazze Pha production discography
 Pha Terrell (1910–1945), American jazz singer

Other 
 Anime Syuukan DX! Mi-Pha-Pu, a Japanese anime series
 Pha Lai Power Station, Vietnam
Peripheral Heart Action Training in bodybuilding